The 1975 CCHA Men's Ice Hockey Tournament was the fourth CCHA Men's Ice Hockey Tournament. It was played between March 7 and March 8, 1975, at St. Louis Arena in St. Louis, Missouri. Saint Louis won the tournament, defeating Lake Superior State 8–3 in the championship game for the second consecutive year.

Conference standings
Note: GP = Games played; W = Wins; L = Losses; T = Ties; PTS = Points; GF = Goals For; GA = Goals Against

Bracket

Semifinals

(1) Saint Louis vs. Western Michigan

(2) Bowling Green vs. (3) Lake Superior State

Championship

(1) Saint Louis vs. (3) Lake Superior State

Tournament awards

All-Tournament Team
F Doug Lawton (Saint Louis)
F Julio Francella (Lake Superior State)
F Tim Dunlop (Western Michigan)
D Kevin O'Rear (Saint Louis)
D Roger Archer (Bowling Green)
G Lindsay Middlebrook (Saint Louis)

References

External links
Central Collegiate Hockey Association

CCHA Men's Ice Hockey Tournament
Ccha tournament
CCHA Men's Ice Hockey Tournament